The culture of Puerto Rico is the result of a number of international and indigenous influences, both past and present. Modern cultural manifestations showcase the island's rich history and help to create an identity which is uniquely Puerto Rican - Taíno (Native Indian), Spanish, African, and North American.

Influences

Taíno

A subgroup of the Arawakan aboriginals, a group of Native Americans in northeastern South America, inhabited the Greater Antilles, but Puerto Rico was inhabited predominantly by Tainos. At the time Juan Ponce de León took possession of the Island, there were about twenty Taino villages, called yucayeque.  It is believed   that Taíno settlements ranged from single families to groups of 3,000 people. 
 
At their arrival the Spaniards expected the Taíno Indians to acknowledge the sovereignty of the king of Spain by payment of gold tribute, to work and supply provisions of food and to observe Christian ways. The Taínos rebelled, most notably in 1511, when several caciques (Indian leaders) conspired to oust the Spaniards. They were joined in this uprising by their traditional enemies, the Caribs. Their weapons, however, were no match against Spanish horses and firearms and the revolt was soon ended brutally by the Spanish forces of Governor Juan Ponce de León.

As a result, Taíno culture, language, and traditions were generally decimated, and were claimed to have "vanished" 50 years after Christopher Columbus arrived. Since the early 21st century, efforts have been made to revive and rebuild Taíno culture.

The Taínos, far more than the Caribs, contributed to the everyday life and language that evolved during the Spanish occupation. Taíno place names are still used for such towns as Utuado, Mayagüez, Caguas, and Humacao, among others.

Many Taino words persist in the Puerto Rican vocabulary of today. Names of plants, trees and fruits includes: maní, leren, ají, yuca, mamey, pajuil, pitajaya, cupey, tabonuco and ceiba. Names of fish, animals and birds include: . Other words were passed not only into Spanish, but also into English, such as huracan (hurricane) and hamaca (hammock). Also, many Taíno superstitions and legends were adopted and adapted by the Spanish and still influence the Puerto Rican imagination.

Europe

The most profound European influence is that of Spain, the island's colonizer. There are also Italian and Sicilian influences, among others. Spanish influence is the most notable of all cultural influences in Puerto Rican culture. Spanish heritage has left an indelible mark on the island, and signs of this cultural exchange can be found everywhere, from the Colonial architecture and official language to the island's literature and local culinary styles. As far back as the 16th century, the Spanish built a series of massive defense structures to protect Old San Juan and its bay from other invaders. Parts of Old San Juan and La Fortaleza are now UNESCO World Heritage Sites.

The culture of European countries has also influenced the development of the performing arts on the island, especially in music. Many of the island's musical genres have their origins in the Spanish culture, which is responsible for such genres of music as decima, seis, danza, and mambo.

Rooster fighting is a sport that has been part of the Puerto Rican culture for centuries. In 1845, Manuel Alonso, in his book , wrote that maybe a  could lack a church, but no barrio of Puerto Rico lacked a cockfighting venue. The sport was passed in families, from generation to generation. There are 71 official venues and hundreds of thousands of people attend events each year. In Daddy Yankee's video for  a cockfight can be seen. In December 2019, cockfighting again became illegal in Puerto Rico, but Governor Wanda Vázquez Garced asked for a reprieve stating the industry brings in $9 million each year and people employed in the industry would be left destitute.

Africa

With the introduction of slavery to the colony, the island experienced an influx of Africans who brought with them the cultural influences of their own tribes.

The presence of African diasporic religions, such as Santeria, is due to African influence. More subtle ties also exist, such as those that connect Puerto Rico's literary history with the rich African tradition of oral storytelling. Also, all Afro-Caribbean, Afro-Latino, and African American cultural influences from the United States, neighboring Caribbean islands, and Puerto Rico itself, are largely African in origin.

The Caribbean and Latin America

The shared African heritage of many Caribbean nations is reflected in cultural pursuits like dance, as well as in local culinary styles. Most regional influences are Latino and Afro-Caribbean. The neighboring islands that have had the most influence on Puerto Rico's dance and music are Cuba, the Dominican Republic, and Jamaica. Panama has shared its great passion for Spanish Reggae with Puerto Rico, the Spanish language version of Jamaican Reggae. Eventually , a Puerto Rican break-off of original Spanish reggae, became very popular throughout Latin America, the Caribbean, the US and Spain.

Puerto Rican artists helped create Salsa music with Cuban artists, and also helped Dominican artists with the development of Merengue. Recent Haitian and Dominican immigration has been producing many new cultural influences. Significant cultural exchange has been evident between Puerto Rico and the US Virgin Islands, especially the islands of St. Croix, Vieques, and Culebra, such as Puerto Rican style Patois mixed with Spanish.

A number of Latin American countries have also exerted influence on Puerto Rico's cultural identity. In the filmmaking community, co-productions between Puerto Rico and other Latin American countries have created an exchange of ideas and influenced their film conventions.  For instance, the Latin sense of humor and fantastical elements are evident in Puerto Rican films.

United States

Culturally, Puerto Rican sentiment for the U.S. tends to vary between emulation and opposition, a result of the complicated socio-political relationship between the two. Since establishment as an unincorporated territory of the United States in 1898, traditional economics, social structure, nationalism, and culture in Puerto Rico has been affected by Puerto Rico's relationship with the U.S.
 
Before the United States captured Puerto Rico from Spain in 1898, the colony was agriculture based. Most worked on sugar cane, tobacco, or coffee plantations. Through the beginning of the 20th century, Puerto Ricans remained agricultural. Operation Bootstrap, an operation of the United States and the Puerto Rico Economic Development Administration, began in 1942 and was put in place to transform Puerto Rico into an industrial colony. Government owned factories were built to shift development to industrial factory work and, eventually, education of the factory work force. One of the effects of the growth of Puerto Rican industry changed the outlook on familial social structure. The United States ideal of small, patriarchal families also impacted the contemporary Puerto Rican family structure in policy. In an attempt to demolish poverty in shantytowns, the Puerto Rico Housing Authority established public housing by example of United States policy. The public housing further disenfranchised the large multi-generation family by dividing nuclear families into public, single-family dwellings. Links to extended family are still an important aspect to the culture of Puerto Rican family structure, however they have been significantly weakened.

The relationship between the United States and Puerto Rico makes national identity complicated. Puerto Ricans maintain United States citizenship while aligning with a uniquely Puerto Rican heritage. Although the island's culture is not heterogeneous, Puerto Rico establishes several binary oppositions to the United States: American identity versus Puerto Rican identity, English language versus Spanish language, Protestant versus Catholic, and Anglo-Saxon heritage versus Hispanic heritage.

Pursuits 

 Architecture of Puerto Rico – the island has a World Heritage Site, and many landmarks from the Pre-Columbian era to modernist architecture by Jose Firpi, Jonathan Marvel and Segundo Cardona.
 Art in Puerto Rico – Puerto Ricans have contributed a great deal to the field of visual arts, including its major museums, individual artists, and collectives.
 Cinema of Puerto Rico – the island's own film industry, as well as its role in international cinema.
 Cuisine of Puerto Rico is gaining greater renown outside the island for its traditional and fusion foods.
 Puerto Rican literature – poets, novelists, and playwrights, such as Julia de Burgos, Giannina Braschi, and Lin-Manual Miranda have helped Puerto Rico gain international acclaim.
 Music of Puerto Rico – music on the island blends diverse cultural influences. Performing arts such as dance are an integral part of cultural expression.
Puerto Rican poetry—Composed in Spanish, Spanglish, or English, Puerto Rican poetry has made great contributions to Nuyorican, American, and slam poetry, and inspired many songwriters.  
 Puerto Rican comic books
 Sports in Puerto Rico

See also

Cultural diversity in Puerto Rico
Corsican immigration to Puerto Rico
French immigration to Puerto Rico
German immigration to Puerto Rico
History of performing arts in Puerto Rico
Irish immigration to Puerto Rico
Spanish immigration to Puerto Rico
List of Puerto Rican slang words and phrases
African influence in Puerto Rican culture
Puerto Rican people

General:
 Latin American culture

References

External links
 Institute of Puerto Rican Culture, a government agency dedicated to the study, preservation, and development of Puerto Rican culture

 
Caribbean culture by dependent territory
Puerto Rico